Delphine Van de Venne, (born 14 December 1974 in Kortrijk) is a Belgian sprint canoer who competed in the mid-1990s. At the 1996 Summer Olympics in Atlanta, she was eliminated in the repechages of the K-1 500 m event.

References
Sports-Reference.com profile

1974 births
Sportspeople from Kortrijk
Belgian female canoeists
Canoeists at the 1996 Summer Olympics
Living people
Olympic canoeists of Belgium
Flemish sportspeople